Matilda Furley (30 May 1813 – 22 October 1899), was a New Zealand storekeeper, baker, butcher, hotel-keeper and community leader. She was born in North Nibley, Gloucestershire, England on 30 May 1813.

References

1813 births
1899 deaths
English emigrants to New Zealand
People from Gloucester
New Zealand traders
New Zealand hoteliers
19th-century New Zealand businesswomen
19th-century New Zealand businesspeople